This is a list of rugby league footballers who played first-grade for the Western Suburbs Magpies. Players are listed in the order they made their debut.

First-grade players (1908-1999)

References

 
Lists of Australian rugby league players
National Rugby League lists
Sydney-sport-related lists